Arthur Kenney (born March 5, 1946) is a retired American professional basketball player. He played at the power forward and center positions, and was nicknamed "The Great Red".

High school
Kenney played high school basketball at Power Memorial Academy (PMA), in Manhattan, New York City. At Power Memorial, he was a teammate of Lew Alcindor (later known as Kareem Abdul-Jabbar). The team's head coach was Jack Donohue, and its assistant coach was Dick Percudani.

In May 2000, Kenney's high school senior season team of 1963–64, was named "The Best High School Team in American History", by the National Sportswriters Association, and it was inducted into the Catholic High School Athletic Association's Hall of Fame as, "The Team of the Century".

College career
Kenney played college basketball at Fairfield University, with the Fairfield Stags, from 1964 to 1968. He was inducted into the Fairfield University Hall of Fame in 1996.

Professional career
For his pro career, Kenney moved to France, where he played with the LNB Pro A club Le Mans, from 1968 to 1970. He then moved to Italy, where he played with the Italian League club Olimpia Milano, from 1970 to 1973. With Milano, he won the FIBA Saporta Cup title in the 1970–71 and 1971–72 seasons. He also won the Italian Cup and the Italian League championship with Milano, during the 1971–72 season.

He then returned to Le Mans, where he played from 1973 to 1975. He played with the Italian Second Division club Partenope Napoli, during the 1975–76 season. In 2013, Olimpia Milano retired his number 18 jersey.

Post-playing career
After he ended his basketball playing career, Kenney went into coaching, and then eventually began a career working on Wall Street.

References

External links

 Italian League profile 

1946 births
Living people
American expatriate basketball people in France
American expatriate basketball people in Italy
American men's basketball players
Basketball players from New York City
Centers (basketball)
Fairfield Stags men's basketball players
Le Mans Sarthe Basket players
Olimpia Milano players
Partenope Napoli Basket players
Power forwards (basketball)